Jaime Prieto Amaya (June 27, 1941 – August 25, 2010) was the Roman Catholic bishop of the Roman Catholic Diocese of Cúcuta, Colombia.

Ordained in 1965, he became bishop in 1993 and in 2008 was appointed bishop of the Cúcuta Diocese.

Notes

1941 births
2010 deaths
21st-century Roman Catholic bishops in Colombia
Major Seminary of Bogotá alumni
20th-century Roman Catholic bishops in Colombia
Roman Catholic bishops of Barrancabermeja
Roman Catholic bishops of Cúcuta